Capital is a department in the San Juan Province (Argentina). Where totally dominated a landscape completely urbanized with a high population density and containing the City of San Juan, focusing on all the power and financial administration of the province

History 
The history department Capital runs parallel to the history provincial (San Juan Province) being, in many cases, impossible to differentiate them. He also shared with the province its patron saint: San Juan Bautista. The city of San Juan was, since its founding on June 13, 1562, the largest population center in the region. Since 1866 the town was organized by Anacleto Gil. Born as a humble village, and remained for a long time. Subsequently, the action of governors and individuals was giving the urban characteristics: paving, trees, public buildings, theatres, rides and lighting. The great advances such as rail, tram, flooring, electricity, telegraph, telephone and sewer arrived in the late 19th century and early 20th century.

Geography 
To the north bordering department Chimbas, on the east by Santa Lucía, to the west and south by Rivadavia Rawson. The approximate population of the department of capital is 118,500 inhabitants.

Population 

According to estimates from INDEC in the year 2,005 had 116,511 inhabitants.
The distinctly urban population continuously receives contributions from the rest of the departments. As offers the most diverse and specialized services, especially health, education and administration, represents a center that attracts large numbers of people, especially during the day. There are numerous cases of immigrants seeking work. There are areas of high concentration, with large vertical constructions as the neighborhood St. Maarten. The more downtown housing are generally preferred by older people, while the rest of the population has chosen to places further away from the bustle of the city.

Services 

The department Capital has all the services of a modern city. It is headquarters of the provincial government since it within its boundaries is Government House, the Legislature and the Court of Justice. The business sector is in the micro center, space defined by the streets on May 25, Spain, July 9 and Rawson Avenue. The educational supply is ample, varied and complete. The department has establishment at all levels (Beginner, EGB 1, 2, 3, Polymodal, Not Higher University and University), which convened a large number of students from all departments, from other provinces and even from neighbouring countries.

Tourism 
While overall sanjuanina building is modern, the department retains old buildings of great historical and architectural value.
Among the buildings that were restored after the earthquake of 1944, we found the Convent of Santo Domingo, the birthplace of Sarmiento, William Rawson Hospital, the Museum of Fine Arts and the Ecole Normale Sarmiento.
The Cathedral of St. John and John Auditorium Victoria are examples of modern buildings in the city. With respect to samples you can visit the Museum of Natural Science, Fine Arts, Tornambé, Crafts Fair and a roving exhibitions.
In recent years have been recovered as centres for the realization of social and cultural events, old warehouses and residences of traditional families of San Juan. Among the residences are the most prominent of Del Bono, and Gonzalez Graffigna Aubone.

Sports 
As a site for sports, the most important thing is the stadium closed Aldo Cantoni, headquarters of world hockey skates; the stadium and velodrome opened, the Club Atletico San Martin, the club Atletico Trinidad and the Sports Complex El Palomar under the Universidad Nacional de San Juan. In the department Capital is the Secretary of Tourism of the province where reports are offered to visitors.

Notes

Departments of San Juan Province, Argentina